Admiral Vyacheslav Alekseyevich Popov (born 22 November 1946) is a retired admiral of the Russian Navy who commanded the Northern Fleet from 1999–2001, with his service period notably including the Kursk submarine disaster.

He was appointed Commander of the Northern Fleet on 29 January 1999. In August 2000 a major exercise was under way, in which the Kursk had a torpedo explosion. He handed over command on 15 December 2001.

References 

Russian admirals
1946 births
People from Luga, Leningrad Oblast
Living people
Members of the Federation Council of Russia (after 2000)